Acácio Rodrigues Alves (April 9, 1925 – August 24, 2010) was the first Roman Catholic bishop of the Roman Catholic Diocese of Palmares, Brazil.

Ordained to the priesthood on March 12, 1949, Rodrigues Alves was appointed bishop of the Palmares Diocese on July 12, 1962, by Pope John XXIII and was ordained on September 16, 1962. He retired on July 12, 2000.

Notes

20th-century Roman Catholic bishops in Brazil
1925 births
2010 deaths
Roman Catholic bishops of Palmares